"Say It Isn't So" is a song by American rock band Bon Jovi. It was released on July 21, 2000, as the second single from their seventh studio album, Crush (2000). David Bryan plays the solo of the song instead of Richie Sambora. Sambora performs vocals for this song along with Jon Bon Jovi.

Music video
The music video was directed by Wayne Isham and features Claudia Schiffer, Arnold Schwarzenegger, Emilio Estevez, and Matt LeBlanc.

Track listings

Australasian CD1
 "Say It Isn't So"
 "Ordinary People" (demo)
 "Welcome to the Good Times" (demo)
 "Livin' on a Prayer" (live at Wembley)
 "Rome Worldwide Album Launch" (video)
 "Bon Jovi Crush B Roll Footage" (video)

Australasian CD2
 "Say It Isn't So"
 "Ain't No Cure for Love" (demo)
 "Stay" (demo)
 "It's My Life"
 "Keep the Faith" (live at Wembley—video)
 "Bon Jovi Crush B Roll Footage" (Part 2—video)

Japanese CD single
 "Say It Isn't So"
 "Save the World"
 "Livin' on a Prayer" (live)
 "Keep the Faith" (live)

UK CD1
 "Say It Isn't So" (UK mix)
 "Ain't No Cure for Love" (demo)
 "Stay" (demo)

UK CD2
 "Say It Isn't So"
 "Ordinary People" (demo)
 "Welcome to the Good Times" (demo)

UK cassette single and European CD single
 "Say It Isn't So"
 "Ain't No Cure for Love" (demo)

European maxi-CD single
 "Say It Isn't So"
 "Ain't No Cure for Love" (demo)
 "Stay" (demo)
 "Keep the Faith" (live at Wembley)

Charts

Release history

References

Bon Jovi songs
2000 songs
2000 singles
Mercury Records singles
Music videos directed by Wayne Isham
Songs written by Billy Falcon
Songs written by Jon Bon Jovi